Outlaw (2005) is the fifth studio album by British band, Alabama 3.

Track listing
 "Intro" – 0:53
 "Last Train to Mashville" – 4:11
 "Terra Firma Cowboy Blues" – 3:29
 "Keep Your Shades On" – 4:46
 "Hello... I'm Johnny Cash" – 4:00
 "Up Above My Head" – 3:57
 "Adrenaline" – 4:24
featuring MC Tunes
 "Have You Seen Bruce Richard Reynolds?" – 4:43
featuring Bruce Reynolds
 "Honey in the Rock" – 4:08
featuring Devlin Love
 "How Can I Protect You" – 4:09
featuring Aslan
 "Let It Slide" – 5:13
 "The Gospel Train" – 5:20

2005 albums
Alabama 3 albums
One Little Independent Records albums